Chantage is a London-based chamber choir conducted by James Davey. Drawing singers from all over the country and all walks of life, the choir won the 2006 Radio 3 Choir of the Year competition.

On 17 January 2009 Chantage backed Mercury Award-winning band Elbow at Abbey Road Studios, London with the BBC Concert Orchestra in a special live performance of their album The Seldom Seen Kid

Described by Norman Lebrecht as "a class act", their album Hark! Chantage at Christmas is available on EMI Gold.

References

External links
 Official site

London choirs